(born 6 January 1964, in Miyazaki Prefecture) is a former Japanese rugby union player who played as fly-half and coach.

Career
After graduating from Nobeoka High School and going to Doshisha University, at the time, he contributed to the victories in the All-Japan University Rugby Championship in 1983 and 1984 editions. In 1986, he joined World. In the same year, Matsuo had his first cap for Japan against USA. In the following year, he took part in the 1987 Rugby World Cup, which was the first Rugby World Cup. In the pool A match against England, he played as centre due to Seiji Hirao playing as fly-half in the lineup. Three years later,  Shinobu Aoki, -who, like Matsuo, was part of the squad that won against Scotland in 1989- was his direct rival for the place as regular fly-half in the Japan national team after the Asia-Pacific qualifiers, but during the 1991 Rugby World Cup, Matsuo took Aoki's place as the regular fly-half for Japan, and took part at all the three pool matches of the World Cup first round, contributing also to the victory in the final pool match against Zimbabwe. Later, he continued his duties as Japan national team, and he also took part at the 1995 Rugby World Cup, although he never played any match in the tournament. He earned a total of 23 international caps for Japan. After retiring, he was appointed by JRFU as resource coach, coaching the Laos national rugby sevens team. As of 2012, he was appointed as coach for Surugadai University RFC.

Notes

External links
Surugadai University RFC Member Profile
2019 ALL FOR JAPAN TEAM

1964 births
Living people
Rugby union fly-halves
Japanese rugby union coaches
Japanese rugby union players
Japan international rugby union players
People from Miyazaki Prefecture